Harpur is an electoral ward in Bedford, England.

Harpur may also refer to:

Places
Harpur, Lumbini, Village Development Committee in Nepal
Harpur, Parsa, Village Development Committee in Nepal
Harpur College, now Binghamton University, New York, United States

People
Ben Harpur (born 1995), Canadian ice hockey player
Charles Harpur (1813-1868), Australian poet
Henry Harpur (disambiguation):
Sir Henry Harpur, 1st Baronet (1585-1638), of the Harpur-Crewe baronets
Sir Henry Harpur, 5th Baronet (1708–1748), for Worcester 1744–47, and for Tamworth 1747–48
Sir Henry Harpur, 6th Baronet  (1739–1789), MP for Derbyshire 1761–68
Henry Harpur-Crewe (1828–1883), English clergyman and naturalist
Patrick Harpur, English writer
Robert Harpur (1731–1825), American politician
Tom Harpur (1929–2017), Canadian author and journalist
Sir William Harpur (1496-1574) Lord Mayor of London